Boophis arcanus is a species of frogs in the family Mantellidae. It is endemic to Madagascar. This species does not show sexual dimorphism.

References

arcanus
Endemic amphibians of Madagascar
Frogs of Africa
Amphibians described in 2010